Elvan Abeylegesse, (also formerly: Hewan Abeye (አልቫን አበይለገሠ, Amharic) and Elvan Can (Turkish); born September 11, 1982) is an Ethiopian-born naturalized Turkish middle and long-distance running athlete who competes over distances from 1500 metres up to the marathon, and also in cross country. She is the former world record-holder for the 5000 metres, at 14:24.68 minutes.

In August 2015, the Turkish Athletics Federation confirmed that an anti-doping test taken during the 2007 World Championships in Athletics had been retested and found to be positive for a controlled substance, and that the athlete had been temporarily suspended pending retesting of her 'B-sample'. If confirmed, Abeylegesse stood to lose her 2007 medal, and possibly other awards from that date. On 29 March 2017, IAAF confirmed the positive test, expunged her results from 25 August 2007 until 25 August 2009 (thereby stripping her of the two silver medals she had won at the 2008 Olympic Games), and banned her from athletics for two years.

Early life and career
Abeylegesse was born Hewan Abeye on September 11, 1982 in Addis Ababa, Ethiopia and raised with her seven brothers and sisters. She began her career running cross country. In 1999, she started for the Ethiopian junior team at the IAAF World Cross Country Championships in Belfast, Northern Ireland and finished ninth. There, she was invited to a meeting in Istanbul, Turkey. Coming to Istanbul, she said that she liked it there very much. "I didn't get enough support from my federation in Ethiopia," she said. "My track club in Turkey gave me all the support I needed. So I decided to move to Turkey. The support was much better in Istanbul. I thought it would be easier to reach my goals in Turkey.” To get Turkish citizenship, she married and took the name Elvan Can. She has since divorced and is now called Elvan Abeylegesse.

“As a youngster, my heroes were Ethiopian runners. I would follow the victories of Gete Wami particularly”, Abeylegesse said. “I studied all their actions: how they slept, how they ate, how they trained, and how they competed.” Registered in the Enka Sports Club in Istanbul, she is coached by Ertan Hatipoglu, a former triple jumper of Turkish origin from Bulgaria. She still has a friendly relationship with other Ethiopian runners, but there is a problem with her former federation. “The officials don’t allow me to train in Ethiopia any longer", Abeylegesse says. “I train now at high altitudes in Turkey as I think that some of my former compatriots see me as a threat. They are uncomfortable with me training in Ethiopia. But I, of course, remain friends with the individual Ethiopian runners.”

Career highlights
Abeylegesse's career in the international arena began at the age of 18 in Grosseto, Italy in 2001 by winning the European 3000 m and 5000 m titles, setting a national record for Turkey. She became a world leader with a time of 8:31:94 in the 3000 m in Brussels, Belgium in 2002 and with a time of 3:58.38 in the 1500 m in Moscow, Russia in 2004.

Abeylegesse has been a scholarship holder with the Olympic Solidarity program since August 2002.

At the Evergood Bergen Bislett Games in Norway on June 11, 2004, the sixth meeting of TDK Golden League, Abeylegesse broke the women's 5000 m world record, which had belonged to Chinese runner Jiang Bo since 1997 (14:28.09), improving the mark by over three seconds to 14:24.68. She became the first Turkish athlete ever to set a world record. "I worked very hard, day and night," Abeylegesse said, speaking through an interpreter. "My target since the first day I started running has been to break world records and become Olympic champion." Şarık Tara, the honorary president of her club, said, "I am proud of our daughter Elvan. Her achievement is an even greater success than our men's national soccer team finishing third in the World Cup."

On 3 June 2006 her record time was beaten by Ethiopian Meseret Defar, who ran in 14:24.53 in New York City.

She ran at the inaugural World 10K Bangalore race in 2008 and finished in a dead heat with Grace Momanyi, with both runners eventually being declared joint victors.

She was the 2010 recipient of the Pierre de Coubertin World Fair Play Trophy, an annual award given by the International Fair Play Committee. She had lent a pair of running shoes to competitor Meselech Melkamu just moments before the beginning of the 10,000 metres final at the 2009 World Championships in Athletics. Having forgotten to bring her shoes to the track, Melkamu went on to take the silver.

Abeylegesse won the 2010 edition of the Ras Al Khaimah Half Marathon in a time of 1:07:07. This was the fastest ever time for a woman in the half marathon race and made her the sixth fastest woman overall. She played down suggestions of a permanent switch to longer road races, however, saying a marathon debut would have to wait until after the 2012 London Olympics.

At the 2010 European Athletics Championships, Abeylegesse won gold in the 10,000 m, finishing in 31 minutes, 10.23 seconds On 28 July 2010, and she won the silver medal in 5000m finishing in 14 minutes, 54.44 seconds on 1 August 2010. She narrowly missed out on a medal at the 2010 IAAF Continental Cup, finishing two seconds behind Molly Huddle in the 5000 m.

She returned to action in 2012 after her pregnancy and made her debut over 20 km, finishing as runner-up at the 20 Kilomètres de Paris. She was also runner-up in the 15K section of the Istanbul Eurasia Marathon. She won the Nice Half Marathon in April 2013. On November 17, 2013 she became runner-up in the women's category at the Istanbul Marathon with a time of 2:29:30.

Doping ban
In August 2015, the Turkish Athletics Federation confirmed that an anti-doping test taken during the 2007 World Championships in Athletics had been retested and found to be positive for a controlled substance, and that the athlete had been temporarily suspended pending retesting of her 'B-sample'. If confirmed, Abeylegesse stood to lose her 2007 medal, and possibly other awards from that date. On 29 March 2017, IAAF confirmed the positive test, expunged her results from 25 August 2007 until 25 August 2009 (thereby stripping her of the two silver medals she had won at the 2008 Olympic Games), and banned her from athletics for two years.

Personal life
Abeylegesse married her longtime partner Semeneh Debelie in February 2011 and decided to take the season off due to pregnancy. In July 2011, she gave birth to a girl named Arsema.

International competitions

Marathons
Istanbul Marathon: 2013,  2nd, 2:29:30

World records
June 11, 2004 Bergen Bislett Games (Golden League), Bergen, Norway (5000 m)  (14:24:68) WR

Personal bests

Performance progression

See also
Turkish women in sports

References

External links

1982 births
Living people
Athletes from Addis Ababa
Turkish female middle-distance runners
Turkish female long-distance runners
Turkish female marathon runners
Ethiopian female marathon runners
Ethiopian female long-distance runners
Ethiopian female middle-distance runners
Olympic athletes of Turkey
Athletes (track and field) at the 2004 Summer Olympics
Athletes (track and field) at the 2008 Summer Olympics
World Athletics Championships athletes for Turkey
World Athletics Championships medalists
European Athletics Championships medalists
World record setters in athletics (track and field)
Turkish people of Ethiopian descent
Ethiopian emigrants to Turkey
Naturalized citizens of Turkey
Enkaspor athletes
European champions for Turkey
Mediterranean Games silver medalists for Turkey
Athletes (track and field) at the 2009 Mediterranean Games
Athletes (track and field) at the 2013 Mediterranean Games
Turkish sportspeople in doping cases
Ethiopian sportspeople in doping cases
Athletes stripped of World Athletics Championships medals
Athletes (track and field) at the 2018 Mediterranean Games
Mediterranean Games medalists in athletics